Mägo de Oz is the first studio album by the band Mägo de Oz.

Unlike later works, this production has arrangements of jazz, blues, country and rock and roll, rhythms that are very different from the current ones and that prevailed in a couple of songs by Jesús de Chamberí.

The album initially was not very successful (no more than 150 copies sold in the first year), this caused the departure of Chema, Juanma and Tony in the following months.

Track listing

Personnel

 Juanma: Voice
 Txus di Fellatio : Drums, Voice in "Gone with the Wind" and "Yankees go Home"
 Mohamed : Violin
 Tony Corral: Saxophone
 Carlitos : Rhythmic Guitar
 Chema: Solo Guitar
 Salva: Low

Collaborations 

 Francisco J. Urchegui: Trumpet in "T 'esnucaré contra'l bidet" and "Gimme some lovin"
 Manuel Villoria: Trombone in "T 'esnucaré contra'l bidé" and "Gimme some lovin"
 Miguel Mengual: Alto sax in "T 'esnucaré contra'l bidé" and "Gimme some lovin"
 Bob Sands: Tenor sax in "T 'esnucaré contra'l bidet" and "Gimme some lovin"
 Javier Iturralde: Baritone saxophone in "T 'esnucaré contra'l bidé"
 Josemi Redondo: Keyboards and piano in "Rock kaki rock", "Gone with the wind left" and "Mägo de Oz"
 Miguel: Harmonica in "Yankees go home" and "Nena"
 Eva: Choirs
 Pedro Gil: Choirs
 Enrique Gil: Choirs
guitar
guitar
bass

1994 debut albums
Mägo de Oz albums
Locomotive Music albums